The 1964 Dartmouth Indians football team was an American football team that represented Dartmouth College during the 1964 NCAA University Division football season. After two straight first-place finishes in 1962 and '63, the Indians dropped to fourth in the Ivy League.

In their tenth season under head coach Bob Blackman, the Indians compiled a 6–3 record and outscored opponents 235 to 135. John McLean was the team captain.

The Indians' 4–3 conference record placed fourth in the Ivy League standings. The Indians outscored Ivy opponents 167 to 129.

Dartmouth played its home games at Memorial Field on the college campus in Hanover, New Hampshire.

Schedule

References

Dartmouth
Dartmouth Big Green football seasons
Dartmouth Indians football